Archduchess Maria Anna of Austria (German: Maria Anna von Habsburg, Erzherzogin von Österreich, also known as Maria Anna von Bayern or Maria-Anna, Kurfürstin von Bayern; 13 January 1610 – 25 September 1665), was a German regent, Electress of Bavaria by marriage to Maximilian I, Elector of Bavaria, and co-regent of the Electorate of Bavaria during the minority of her son Ferdinand Maria, Elector of Bavaria from 1651 to 1654.

Life

Archduchess of Austria

Born in Graz, she was the fifth child and second, but oldest surviving, daughter of Archduke Ferdinand of Inner Austria by his first wife Maria Anna, a daughter of William V, Duke of Bavaria. She was probably named after her mother, who died in 1616.

Maria Anna, who had a particular fondness for hunting, received a strict Jesuit upbringing and was considered a great beauty with exceptional virtues, such as prudence, orderly life and stateliness. She also spoke fluent Italian in addition to her native German.

In 1619 her father became Holy Roman Emperor and King of Bohemia and Hungary, an event that considerably raised her status. Two years later, in 1622, the now Emperor Ferdinand II married again, with Eleonora, daughter of Vincenzo Gonzaga, Duke of Mantua, with whom he had no children.

Marriage

On 15 July 1635 at the Augustinian Church, Vienna, Maria Anna married her uncle, Maximilian I, Elector of Bavaria, whose previous wife, Elisabeth of Lorraine, had died a few months earlier. The wedding was celebrated by Franz von Dietrichstein, Bishop of Olomouc.

In the marriage contract, which was signed two days later on 17 July, the Emperor made the exceptional stipulation that Maria Anna would not renounce her rights over the Habsburg inheritance (Erbverzicht) as was customary for Austrian Archduchesses when they married foreign princes; this was made probably by Ferdinand II with the intention to secure the rights of his eldest daughter in the case of the extinction of his male descendants. As a dowry, Maria Anna received the amount of 250,000 florins secured from Wasserburg Castle and the districts of Kraiburg and Neumarkt. As a widow's seat she received Trausnitz Castle in Landshut.

With this union, the Bavarian Elector not only gained the opportunity to sire the long-waited heir (his first marriage was childless) but also to demonstrate his alliance with the Holy Roman Empire against France, which was prepared for an imminent war. However, this connection only played a minor role in the relations between Austria and Bavaria later.

Electress of Bavaria

The marriage was very happy and Maximilian I cared for his wife lovingly. During Maria Anna's first pregnancy, the Electoral couple made a pilgrimage to Andechs to pray for a happy birth. On 31 October 1636, the Electress gave birth to her first son, who was named Ferdinand Maria after his grandfather Ferdinand II, who also acted as godfather for the child. The childbirth proved to be extremely difficult for Maria Anna; she became so weak that she lost her ability to speak. Her healing was attributed to the help of the relics of Saint Francis of Paola, so Maximilian I founded in Neunburg vorm Wald a monastery consecrated to him. Almost two years later, on 30 September 1638, the Electress gave birth a second son, Maximilian Philipp Hieronymus.

Maria Anna assisted her husband in government affairs and showed interest in the politics of the Bavarian Electorate; she even took part in the meetings of the Council of Ministers. Despite her Habsburg origins (she had an extensive correspondence with her brother Ferdinand III and other relatives), she was completely dedicated  to the Bavarian viewpoint. In addition, she conducted lively exchanges of opinion with high officials of the Munich.

After the conquest of Philipsburg fortress by the French in 1644, Maria Anna urged her brother Leopold Wilhelm, on behalf of her husband, to enter into peace negotiations. (Archduke Leopold Wilhelm had been commander of the Imperial army since 1639.) Shortly before his death in 1650, Maximilian I had a Treuherzige Information (Trust information) written for his wife to give her guidance for her upcoming regency.

Regent of the Electorate of Bavaria

When Maximilian I wrote his will in 1641, Maria Anna claimed in this for the eventual reign of her son, a co-signature law in national matters. However, the Office of the Administrator in Bavaria and Saxony claimed that according to the Golden Bull women were excluded from government. She consulted an expertise commission without her husband's knowledge and secured a favorable ruling concerning her rights added in Maximilian I's will. Thus, after Maximilian I's death (27 September 1651) his brother Albert VI, Duke of Bavaria legally became the regent for Ferdinand Maria and was confirmed in that position in both Imperial and Electoral courts. Maria Anna assumed full responsibility for the Department of Justice and other country administrative tasks, however, which virtually left the Dowager Electress ruler of Bavaria. In addition to Albert VI and the Dowager Electress, the Hofkammerpräsident Mändl belonged to the administration that continued to work with the young Elector when he attained his majority in 1654.

In 1664 Maria Anna, who remained a close advisor to her son even after the end of her regency, suggested putting the country under the patronage of St. Joseph. After the death of her husband, she lived in the so-called Widow's floor (Witwenstock) in the southwestern part of the Munich Residenz. Until her death she was a member of the Privy Council, the highest governmental body, although she hadn't the right of voting.

She died in Munich aged 55 and was buried at St. Michael's Church, while her heart was deposited in the Shrine of Our Lady of Altötting.

In literature

Maria Anna is a central character in the novel, 1634: The Bavarian Crisis (Eric Flint & Virginia DeMarce. Baen Books.)
She escaped marriage to Maximilian and escaped to her cousin, Don Fernando, who had declared himself "King in the Low Countries".

Ancestry

References and notes

|-

|-

1610 births
1665 deaths
17th-century House of Habsburg
Electresses of the Palatinate
House of Wittelsbach
Electresses of Bavaria
Austrian princesses
17th-century women rulers
Duchesses of Bavaria
Regents of Bavaria
German Roman Catholics
Daughters of emperors
Burials at St. Michael's Church, Munich
Daughters of kings